Sandy Ground Historic Archeological is a historic archaeological site and national historic district located at Sandy Ground, Staten Island, New York. The district encompasses one contributing building and one contributing site.

It was added to the National Register of Historic Places in 1982.

References

External links
Save Sandy Ground

Archaeological sites on the National Register of Historic Places in New York City
Historic districts in Staten Island
Historic districts on the National Register of Historic Places in New York City
National Register of Historic Places in Staten Island